Lin Shih-chia (born 20 May 1993) is a Taiwanese competitive archer. She has won a career total of four medals (one gold, two silver, and one bronze) in a major international competition, spanning the Summer Universiade, the World Championships, and the Summer Olympics.

Lin rose to prominence in the global archery scene at the 2015 Summer Universiade in Gwangju, South Korea. There, she confidently took out the slick South Korean women from the final match 5–3 to hand the trio of Hsiung Mei-chien and London 2012 Olympian Tan Ya-ting a gold-medal triumph in the team recurve tournament.

Shortly after the Universiade, Lin continued to build her success in the sport by adding two more medals to her career treasury, a silver each in the individual and mixed team recurve, at the World Championships in Copenhagen, Denmark.

Lin was selected to compete for Chinese Taipei's archery squad at the 2016 Summer Olympics in Rio de Janeiro, shooting in both individual and team recurve tournaments. Two months before her maiden Games, she commanded the Chinese Taipei trio in defeating the Estonian side for one of three women's team spaces at the World Archery Cup meet in Antalya, Turkey. Lin opened the tournament by discharging 651 points, 15 perfect tens, and 6 bull's eyes to seal the ninth seed against a field of 63 other archers in the classification round, along with her trio's cumulative score of 1,932. Sitting outside of the top three at fourth position in the team recurve, Lin and her compatriots Tan and Le Chien-ying bounced back from their semifinal defeat to the eventual champions South Korea to secure a 5–3 triumph over the Italian women for the bronze medal. In the women's individual recurve, Lin successfully held off a spirited challenge by Egypt's Reem Mansour in the opening round, before she faced a 2–6 defeat in her subsequent match from the unheralded Indian Bombayla Devi Laishram.

References

External links
 

Taiwanese female archers
Living people
People from Hsinchu
1993 births
Olympic archers of Taiwan
Archers at the 2016 Summer Olympics
World Archery Championships medalists
Medalists at the 2016 Summer Olympics
Olympic bronze medalists for Taiwan
Olympic medalists in archery
Universiade medalists in archery
Universiade gold medalists for Chinese Taipei
Medalists at the 2015 Summer Universiade
21st-century Taiwanese women